Pervomaysky is a rural locality (a selo) and the administrative centre of Pervomaysky Selsoviet, Blagovarsky District, Bashkortostan, Russia. The population was 970 as of 2010. There are 18 streets.

Geography 
Pervomaysky is located 21 km west of Yazykovo (the district's administrative centre) by road. Starye Sanny is the nearest rural locality.

References 

Rural localities in Blagovarsky District